Cetotherium ("whale beast") is an extinct genus of baleen whales from the family Cetotheriidae.

Taxonomy
 
Based on more recent phylogenetic studies and revisions of many 19th century genera, much smaller monophyletic Cetotheriidae and Cetotherium sensu stricto is limited to a single or only a few species. For example,  included only C. rathkii and C. riabinini in the genus and only ten genera in the family.

Cetotheriidae were thought to have gone extinct during the Pliocene until 2012, when it was hypothesized that the pygmy right whale was the sole surviving species of this family.

Formerly assigned to Cetotherium

The following species were originally described as nominal species of Cetotherium but have been either reassigned to other genera or removed from Cetotherium:

 Cetotherium furlongi Kellogg, 1925, is known from a partial skull from the Burdigalian of the Vaqueros Formation in California, but the holotype is lost.
 Cetotherium gastaldii Strobel, 1875, known from the early Pliocene-age Sabbie d'Asti Formation of the Piedmont region in Italy, is now the type species of the eschrichtiid genus Eschrichtioides.
 Cetotherium klinderi Brandt, 1871, is known from an isolated earbone from Miocene sediments in Chişinău, Moldova. Although fragmentary, it is not congeneric with the two species of Cetotherium.
 Cetotherium maicopicum Spasski, 1951, based on a specimen from the late Miocene of the Russian Caucasus, was reassigned to the genus Kurdalagonus from the same region in 2012, although Gol'din and Startsev (2016) have questioned this referral.
 Cetotherium mayeri Brandt, 1871, known from a partial skeleton, has been reassigned to Mithridatocetus.

Cetotherium incertum Brandt, 1873, known from a vertebra, and "Ziphius" priscus Eichwald, 1840  are nomina dubia, while Cetotherium pusillum Nordmann, 1860 requires re-assessment.

Evolution
 
Cetotheres came into existence during the Oligocene epoch. The cetotheres have been divided into two sub-groups. One group includes Cetotherium. From evolutionary perspective, these whales share some characteristics of the Balaenopteridae and Eschrichtiidae.

Paleobiology
Fossil records have revealed a predator-prey relationship between large sharks (e.g. O. megalodon) and Cetotheriids. The raptorial toothed whale, Livyatan melvillei, may too have posed a threat to these whales.

See also

 Evolution of Cetaceans

References

Notes

Sources

Barry Cox, Colin Harrison, R.J.G. Savage, and Brian Gardiner. (1999): The Simon & Schuster Encyclopedia of Dinosaurs and Prehistoric Creatures: A Visual Who's Who of Prehistoric Life. Simon & Schuster.
 
 

 

 

 
 
 

Baleen whales
Miocene cetaceans
Neogene mammals of North America
Prehistoric cetacean genera
Fossil taxa described in 1843